The  is a limited express train service operated by the West Japan Railway Company (JR West) between  and 

Station stops
Stations in parentheses are not served by all services.

Thunderbird
Osaka – Kanazawa: Osaka -  - -  - - - - - -  - - - - - 

Kanazawa – Wakuraonsen: Kanazawa - - - -  - -  -

Business Thunderbird
(an extra train which runs from Osaka to Kanazawa in the morning on weekdays after holidays)

Osaka → Shin-Osaka → Kyoto → Tsuruga → Takefu → Fukui → Awaraonsen → Komatsu → Kanazawa

Rolling stock

 681 series EMUs (since April 1995)
 683 series EMUs (since March 2001)

Formations
Green: Green car (first class)
White: Standard class car
R: Reserved seats
NR: Non-reserved seats

Thunderbird

Business Thunderbird

History
From the start of the 20 April 1995 timetable revision, new 681 series EMUs were introduced on Osaka to Toyama services, named Super Raichō (Thunderbird). These became simply Thunderbird from March 1997.

The last remaining Raichō service was discontinued from the start of the 12 March 2011 timetable revision, with all trains subsequently using the Thunderbird name.

From the start of the revised timetable on 14 March 2015, with the opening of the Hokuriku Shinkansen, all Thunderbird services were truncated to operate between Osaka, Kanazawa and Wakura-Onsen.

2006 rape incident
On 3 August 2006, a woman was raped by a 36-year-old man in a train toilet while travelling on the Thunderbird 50 service (just after Fukui Station), despite the car being occupied by approximately 40 other passengers. As a result, JR West introduced a "women-only" section in the reserved-seating cars of Raichō and Thunderbird trains from October 2007, and JR East added prominent "SOS" stickers inside all of its trains in June 2007. On 17 January 2008, the district court in Otsu sentenced the man to 18 years in prison.

Future developments
All of the 681 and 683 series trainsets used on Thunderbird limited express services are scheduled to undergo a programme of refurbishment from autumn 2015 until the end of fiscal 2018.

See also
 Shirasagi: Limited-express service between Nagoya and the Hokuriku region, using identical rolling stock with slightly different livery

References

External links

West Japan Railway Company

Named passenger trains of Japan
Railway services introduced in 1995
West Japan Railway Company